The following is a list of notable deaths in August 2003.

Entries for each day are listed alphabetically by surname. A typical entry lists information in the following sequence:
 Name, age, country of citizenship at birth, subsequent country of citizenship (if applicable), reason for notability, cause of death (if known), and reference.

August 2003

1
Bob McMaster, 82, Australian wrestler and rugby player.
Guy Thys, 80, former Belgian national football coach.
Marie Trintignant, 41, French actress and daughter of actor Jean-Louis Trintignant, beaten to death by singer Bertrand Cantat .
Gordon Arnaud Winter, 90, Canadian Lieutenant Governor of Newfoundland.

2
Ken Coote, 75, English footballer.
Don Estelle, 70, British actor.
Sir Charles Kerruish, 86, Manx politician.
Mike Levey, 55, American infomercial host, cancer.
Paulinho Nogueira, 75, Brazilian guitarist, singer and composer.
Peter Safar, 79, Austrian-born American physician, cancer.
Lesley Woods, 92, American actress (The Edge of Night, All My Children, The Bold and the Beautiful).
Hatten Yoder, 82, American petrologist, writer and historian, pioneered the study of minerals under high pressure and temperatures.

3
Joyce Macdonald, 81, New Zealand backstroke swimmer.
Joseph Saidu Momoh, 66, President of Sierra Leone.
Alan Reiher, 76, Australian public servant.
Roger Voudouris, 48, American singer-songwriter and guitarist, liver disease.

4
Anthony of Sourozh, 89, Russian monk, bishop and broadcaster, longest-ordained hierarch of the Russian Orthodox Church.
Pål Arne Fagernes, 29, Norwegian javelin thrower and olympian, car accident.
Chung Mong-hun, 54, Korean businessman, suicide.
Sarup Singh, 86, Indian academic and politician.
James Welch, 62, American Blackfeet and Gros Ventre writer and poet (Winter in the Blood, Fools Crow).

5
Tite Curet Alonso, 77, Puerto Rican music composer, critic and journalist.
John Flemming, 62, British economist.
Samuel J. Tedesco, 88, American politician, Lieutenant Governor of Connecticut.
Don Turnbull, 66, UK games magazine editor.
Benjamin Vaughan, 85, Welsh Anglican priest, Bishop of Swansea and Brecon.
Robert Joseph Ward, 77, American judge (U.S. District Judge of the U.S. District Court for the Southern District of New York).

6
Julius Baker, 87, American flute player, principal flutist of the New York Philharmonic for 18 years.
Robin Banerjee, 94, Indian environmentalist and wildlife photographer.
William Bateman Hall, 80, British nuclear engineer.
Louis Lasagna, 80, American physician and professor of medicine, lymphoma.
Roberto Marinho, 98, Brazilian businessman.
Grover Mitchell, 73, American jazz trombonist, cancer.
Larry Taylor, 85, English actor and stuntman.

7
K. D. Arulpragasam, 71, Sri Lankan Tamil academic.
Grigoriy Lvovitch Bondarevsky, 83, Russian professor, writer, and historian, murdered.
Melvin DeStigter, 74, American politician, cancer.
Charles Jones, 85, Australian politician.
Roxie Collie Laybourne, 92, American ornithologist.
Mickey McDermott, 74, American baseball player (Boston Red Sox, Washington Senators, Kansas City Athletics).
Pierre Vilar, 97, French historian, authoritative historian of Spain.
Claude Alvin Villee Jr., 86, American biologist and author, wrote a widely used biology textbook.
Rajko Žižić, 48, Yugoslavian professional basketball player (Summer Olympics medals: 1976 silver, 1980 gold, 1984 bronze).

8
Peter Blunt, 79, British Army officer and businessman.
Ismail Ahmed Cachalia, 94, South African political activist.
Martha Chase, 75, American geneticist, pneumonia.
Sam Gillespie, 32, Australian-born philosopher.
Lilli Gyldenkilde, 67, Danish politician, cancer.
Bhupen Khakhar, 69, Indian contemporary artist.
Allan McCready, 86, New Zealand politician.
Giant Ochiai, 30, Japanese professional wrestler and mixed martial artist, subdural hematoma.
Sir Edward Pickering, 81, British newspaper editor.

9
Ali Bakar, 55, Malaysian footballer.
Ray Harford, 58, English football manager.
Gregory Hines, 57, American dancer, actor.
Chester Ludgin, 77, American baritone.
Billy Rogell, 98, American baseball player (Boston Red Sox, Detroit Tigers, Chicago Cubs).
Esmond Wright, 87, British historian, media personality and politician (Member of Parliament for Glasgow Pollok).

10
Constance Chapman, 91, English  actor.
Jacques Deray, 74, French film director and screenwriter.
Aïcha Fofana, Malian translator and author.
Carmita Jiménez, 64, Puerto Rican singer.
Jimmy Kelly, 71, English footballer.
Bill Perkins, 79, American jazz saxophonist and flutist.
Cedric Price, 68, English architect and writer.

11
Roger Antoine, 81, French basketball player (1956 Olympic basketball, 1960 Olympic basketball).
Armand Borel, 80, Swiss mathematician, wrote articles fundamental to the development of mathematics.
Herb Brooks, 66, American hockey player and coach (1980 Olympic gold medal winning "Miracle on Ice" hockey team).
Diana Mitford, 93, English socialite, one of the Mitford sisters and widow of fascist leader Oswald Mosley.
John Shearman, 72, British art historian.
Joseph Ventaja, 73, French boxer (bronze medal in featherweight boxing at the 1952 Summer Olympics).

12
Sir William Douglas, 81, Barbadian jurist, Chief Justice of Barbados (1965–1986).
Jackie Hamilton, 65, British stand-up comedian.
Matt Moffitt, 46, Australian singer, songwriter.
Albert Lemieux, 87, Canadian politician and businessman.
Walter J. Ong, 90, American Jesuit priest, professor of English literature, historian, and philosopher.
Edward Skottowe Northrop, 92, American judge (U.S. District Judge of the U.S. District Court for the District of Maryland).

13
Ward Bennett, 85, American designer and artist.
Charlie Devens, 93, American baseball player (New York Yankees).
Lothar Emmerich, 61, German football player.
Kazım Kartal, 67, Turkish actor, heart attack.
Michael Maclagan, 89, British historian.
Ed Townsend, 74, American songwriter and producer.

14
Chuck Brown, 52, American politician.
Bishop Donal Lamont, 92, Irish born Rhodesian Roman Catholic bishop and Nobel Peace Prize nominee.
Helmut Rahn, 73, German footballer, World Champion 1954.
Robin Thompson, 72, Irish rugby player.
Kirk Varnedoe, 57, American art historian, chief curator at the Museum of Modern Art.

15
Janny Brandes-Brilleslijper, 86, Dutch nurse, Nazi resister and last known person to see Anne Franke
Red Hardy, 80, American baseball player (New York Giants).
Enric Llaudet, 86, Spanish businessman and sports executive.
Mack Magaha, 75, American bluegrass fiddler.
Roy Neal, 82, American television correspondent, covered the manned space program for NBC News.
Eric Nisenson, 57, American author and jazz historian, kidney failure related to leukemia.

16
Idi Amin, 78, Ugandan military officer, President of Uganda, known as a murderous and erratic ruler.
Nándor Balázs, 77, Hungarian-American physicist.
Bert Crane, 80, Australian politician.
Lowell Johnston, 77, Canadian politician and businessman.
Charles C. Noble, 87, American major general and engineer.
Ben Mang Reng Say, 75, Indonesian politician, stroke.
Gösta Sundqvist, 46, Finnish musician and radio personality, heart attack.
James Whitehead, 67, American poet and novelist (Joiner).

17
Ben Belitt, 92, American poet and translator.
James Chalker, 90, Canadian politician and businessperson.
Paolo Massimo Antici, 79, Italian diplomat.
Margaret Raia, 78, American actress with dwarfism, brain seizure.
Connie Douglas Reeves, 101, member of the National Cowgirl Museum and Hall of Fame, complications following a fall.

18
Alan Green, 71, British local politician.
Tony Jackson, 65, English singer and bass-guitar player, alcoholism.
Jocelyne Jocya, 61, French singer and songwriter, breast cancer.
Endre Szász, 77, Hungarian artist.
Zachary Turner, 1, American boy, murder–suicide, his killing is documented in the movie Dear Zachary

19
Al Bansavage, 65, American professional football player (USC, Los Angeles Chargers, Oakland Raiders).
Lester Mondale, 99, American Unitarian minister and humanist.
John Munro, 72, Canadian politician (member of Parliament of Canada representing Hamilton East, Ontario).
Carlos Roberto Reina, 77, former president of Honduras.
Notable victims killed in the Canal Hotel bombing in Baghdad, Iraq:
Gillian Clark, 47, Canadian aid worker for the Christian Children's Fund
Reham Al-Farra, 29, Jordanian diplomat and journalist.
Arthur Helton, 54, American Director of peace and conflict studies at the U.S. Council on Foreign Relations.
Reza Hosseini, 43, Iranian UNOHCI Humanitarian affairs officer
Jean-Sélim Kanaan, 33, Egyptian, Italian and French United Nations diplomat and member of Sérgio Vieira de Mello's staff.
Sérgio Vieira de Mello, 55, Brazilian UN diplomat and Secretary-General's Special Representative in Iraq.
Fiona Watson, 35, Scottish member of Vieira de Mello's staff, political affairs officer.
Nadia Younes, 57, Egyptian United Nations aide, chief of staff for Vieira de Mello.

20
Ian MacDonald, 54, British music critic, suicide.
Brianne Murphy, 70, British cinematographer,.
Nermin Neftçi, 78/79, Turkish jurist and politician.
John Ogbu, 64,  Nigerian-American anthropologist and professor, post-surgery heart attack.
Andrew Ray, 64, British actor.

21
Ismail Abu Shanab, 52–53, Palestinian political leader, a founder and the second highest leader of Hamas.
Ken Coleman, 78, American radio and television sportscaster.
John Coplans, 83, British artist, art writer, curator, and museum director.
Frank Harlan Freedman, 78, American judge (U.S. District Judge of the U.S. District Court for the District of Massachusetts).
Fraser Noble, 85, Scottish classicist, economist and university leader (University of Leicester, University of Aberdeen).
Kathy Wilkes, 57, English philosopher and education worker in Eastern Europe.
Wesley Willis, 40, American singer-songwriter and visual artist, leukemia.

22
Imperio Argentina, 92, Argentine actress and singer.
Colleen Browning, 85, American painter.
Julie Dusanko, 81, Canadian baseball player (AAGPBL)
Arnold Gerschwiler, 89, Swiss figure skating trainer.
Glenn Stetson, 62, Canadian singer.

23
Hy Anzell, 79, American actor (Little Shop of Horrors, Checking Out, Bananas, Annie Hall).
J. Bowyer Bell, 71, American historian, artist and art critic, best known as a terrorism expert.
Bobby Bonds, 57, American baseball player (San Francisco Giants, California Angels) and father of San Francisco Giants ballplayer Barry Bonds.
Maurice Buret, 94, French equestrian competitor (gold medal in equestrian team dressage at the 1948 Summer Olympics).
Mal Colston, 65, Australian politician.
Jack Dyer, 89, Australian rules football legend.
John Geoghan, 68, defrocked American pedophile priest.
Robert N. C. Nix Jr., 75, American judge, chief justice of the Pennsylvania Supreme Court from 1984 to 1996.
Michael Kijana Wamalwa, 58, Kenyan politician, eighth Vice-President of Kenya.
Ed Zandy, 83, American trumpet player, member of the second Glenn Miller Orchestra, formed in 1938.

24
Harry W. Addison, 82, American author.
Robert C. Bruce, 88, American actor.
John Burgess, 94, American bishop of the Episcopal Diocese of Massachusetts, first African-American to head an Episcopal diocese.
John Jacob Rhodes, 86, American politician (House Minority Leader, U.S. Representative for Arizona's 1st congress. dist.).
Sir Wilfred Thesiger, 93, British explorer.
Zena Walker, 69, British actress (Tony Award for Best Featured Actress in a Play for A Day in the Death of Joe Egg).
Kent Walton, 86, British sports commentator, known for his wrestling commentary on ITV's World of Sport from 1955 to 1988.
Wendell L. Wray, 77, American librarian and professor, director of the Schomburg Center for Research in Black Culture.

25
Clive Barry, 80, Australian novelist.
Tom Feelings, 70, American cartoonist, children's book illustrator, and author.
Harold McMaster, 87, American inventor and entrepreneur.
Hjalmar Pettersson, 96, Swedish cyclist (men's individual road race at the 1928 Summer Olympics).
Ajit Vachani, 52, Indian film and television actor.
Waid Vanderpoel, 81, American financier and conservationist.

26
Wayne Andre, 71, American jazz trombonist and session musician (Liza Minnelli, Bruce Springsteen, Alice Cooper).
Sultanah Bahiyah, 73, Malaysian Sultanah and Raja.
Edo Belli, 85, American architect, one of Chicago's top architects.
Wilma Burgess, 64, American country music singer ("Misty Blue", "Baby", "Don't Touch Me"), heart attack.
Clive Charles, 51, English football player, coach and television announcer, prostate cancer.
Hans Fränkel, 86, German-American sinologist.
Bimal Kar, 81, Bengali writer and novelist.
Jim Wacker, American college football coach (Texas Christian University, University of Minnesota).

27
Jinx Falkenburg, 84, American actress and model.
Henry P. Glass, 91, Austrian-born American designer and architect.
Marc Honegger, 77, French musicologist and choirmaster.
Kogga Devanna Kamath, 81, Indian puppeteer.
Pierre Poujade, 82, French populist politician.
Nikolai Todorov, 82, Bulgarian historian and politician, acting President (1990)
Charles Van Horne, 82, Canadian politician (member of Parliament of Canada representing Restigouche—Madawaska, New Brunswick).

28
Frank E. Bolden, 90, American journalist, Pittsburgh street reporter and World War II war correspondent.
William Cochran, 81, British physicist.
Peter Hacks, 75, German playwright and author.
Wilfred Hoare, 93, English cricketer.
Richard Morris, American author.

29
Herbert Abrams, 82, American portrait artist (Jimmy Carter, George H. W. Bush, William Westmoreland, Arthur Miller).
Horace W. Babcock, 90, American astronomer, director of the Palomar Observatory from 1964 to 1978.
Anant Balani, 41, Indian film director and screenwriter, heart attack.
Dick Bogard, 66, American minor league baseball player, manager and MLB scout (Houston Astros, Milwaukee Brewers, Oakland Athletics).
Ayatollah Sayed Mohammed Baqir al-Hakim, 63, Iraqi cleric and politician.
Madame Anahit, 85–86, Turkish accordionist, heart failure.

30
Robert Abplanalp, 81, American inventor and industrialist, invented aerosol spray valve, confidant of Richard Nixon.
Webster Anderson, 70, American U.S. Army soldier and Medal of Honor recipient for his actions in the Vietnam War.
Arthur Edward Blanchette, 82, Canadian diplomat.
Charles Bronson, 81, American actor (The Magnificent Seven, The Great Escape, Death Wish).
Donald Davidson, 86, American philosopher.
Claude Passeau, 94, American baseball player (Pittsburgh Pirates, Philadelphia Phillies, Chicago Cubs).

31
Jelena de Belder-Kovačič, 78, Slovenian-Belgian botanist and horticulturist.
Anne Grosvenor, Duchess of Westminster, 88, Irish born peeress.
Warren Rogers, 81, American journalist.
John Storrs, 83, American architect in Oregon.
Pavel Tigrid, 85, Czech writer, publisher, author and politician.
Jung Yong-hoon, 24, South Korean footballer, car accident.

References 

2003-08
 08